The Queensland Residents rugby league team is a representative rugby league team consisting of players who compete in the Intrust Super Cup (Queensland Cup) competition. They currently play an annual fixture against NSW Cup Representative Team, often as a curtain raiser to a State of Origin game.

The team is administered by the Queensland Rugby League and regularly played its home matches at Suncorp Stadium, until 2015, when they starting playing at Brisbane's Langlands Park (now known as Suzuki Stadium). Up until 1995, the side played against touring international sides and went on tours to countries like New Zealand and France.

A number of Queensland Residents players have gone onto play for Queensland in State of Origin, including Daly Cherry-Evans and David Taylor. As Residents selection has no bearing on Origin eligibility, a number of players have gone on to also represent New South Wales, including Trent Hodkinson and Jamie Buhrer. New Zealand internationals Jeremy Smith and Adam Blair are also former Queensland Residents representatives.

History

The first Queensland Residents side was selected in 1988 and went on a three-game tour of New Zealand, winning two games. Over the next six years the side toured New Zealand two more times (1990, 1992), Papua New Guinea (1989, 1995), France (1989), Fiji (1992, 1993), Western Samoa (1993), Tonga (1993) and South Africa (1994). In 1990, they defeated the touring French side in Rockhampton and in 1992 lost to the touring Great Britain side in Townsville.

Between 1991 and 1993, the Residents played three games against a Sydney Metropolitan Cup rep side, drawing two games and winning one. In 2003 and 2004, they played two games against Western Australia, winning both games. In 2001 and 2002, they were defeated twice by the Queensland Emerging Origin squad.

Since 1994, the Queensland Residents have played an annual fixture against the New South Wales Residents, currently known as the NSW Cup Representative Team. The fixture was formerly a curtain raiser to a State of Origin game but as of 2015 has been played on the annual Representative Weekend.

Record

Results

2005

2006

2007

2008

2009

2010

2011

2012

2013

2014

2015

2016

2017

2018

2019

See also
Queensland state rugby league team
Australia national rugby league team
Junior Kangaroos
Australian Schoolboys rugby league team

References

External links

Res
Rugby League State of Origin
Rugby league representative teams in Queensland